Raimundo Arrais do Rosário (born August 1956), is a civil servant, ex-legislator (1992-1999) and the current Secretariat for Transport and Public Works (2014- ) of the Macau Special Administrative Region of China.

Rosário, a Macanese of Portuguese ancestry, was born in Macau, then under Portuguese administration, in August 1956. He received a bachelor's degree in civil engineering from University of Porto and completed a postgraduate programme in soil mechanics from Universidade Nova de Lisboa. Rosário became a civil servant in 1979 until 1990, having served in various positions:

 Technician of the Secretariat for Transport and Public Works
 Department Head of the Secretariat for Transport and Public Works
 Deputy Secretary of the Secretariat for Transport and Public Works
 Chairman of the Land Committee and Traffic Committee.

From 1990 to 1999 he became a freelance civil engineer. Between 1992 and 1999, he was a member of the Legislative Assembly of Macau, being appointed by the Governor of Macau. He was also a member of the Drafting Committee of the Basic Law of Macau, a member of the Preparatory Committee of the Macau Special Administrative Region, and a member of the Portuguese delegation of the Sino-Portuguese Land Group.

After the transfer of Macau to China (1999), and until 2014, Rosário was director of the Macau Economic and Trade Office in Lisbon, director of the Macau Economic and Trade Office to the European Union in Brussels, and director of the Macau Economic and Trade Office to the World Trade Organization in Geneva.

Since returning to Macau in 2014, he has been the current Secretary for Transport and Public Works of Macau.

See also

 List of members of the Legislative Assembly of Macau

References

1956 births
Living people
Macanese people
Government ministers of Macau
University of Porto alumni